Khamis Hajur is a sub-district located in Habur Zulaymah District, 'Amran Governorate, Yemen. Khamis Hajur had a population of 7986 according to the 2004 census.

References 

Sub-districts in Habur Zulaymah District